The Ambassador Extraordinary and Plenipotentiary of the Russian Federation to the Federative Republic of Brazil is the official representative of the President and the Government of the Russian Federation to the President and the Government of Brazil.

The ambassador and his staff work at large in the Embassy of Russia in Brasília. There are consulates general in Rio de Janeiro and São Paulo. Since 1995 the ambassador to Brazil has been concurrently accredited to the Republic of Suriname.

History of diplomatic relations

Consular relations between Russia and what became the modern state of Brazil date back to the early nineteenth century. With the French invasion of Portugal in 1807 during the Napoleonic Wars, the Portuguese Court was transferred to its colony in Brazil. The new capital of the Portuguese Empire was thereafter in Rio de Janeiro. In early July 1811 Friedrich von der Pahlen was appointed envoy to the Portuguese court in Rio de Janeiro. On 30 July that year Xavier and Mikhail Labensky were appointed Consul General and Vice Consul respectively in Rio de Janeiro. Rio de Janeiro ceased to be the capital of the Portuguese Empire in April 1821, with the return of the court to Portugal. The Russian mission moved to Portugal with the court, though consular relations were maintained between Russia and Brazil until November 1827. One of the early consuls during this period was Grigori Langsdorf, who carried out expeditions to the interior of Brazil, gathering material on the flora and fauna, as well as conducting cartographic studies. 

Diplomatic relations between the Russian Empire and the Empire of Brazil were first established on 3 October 1828. , the head of the Consular Affairs Expedition of the Russian Ministry of Foreign Affairs since 1809, had taken a particular interest in the initial establishment of the consulate in Brazil, was appointed the first envoy to Brazil.  They continued after the establishment of the First Brazilian Republic in 1889, but were broken off after the October Revolution in 1917 and the establishment of the Soviet Union. Diplomatic relations between the Soviet Union and the United States of Brazil were established briefly in 1945, but were broken off in 1947 after the establishment of the Fourth Brazilian Republic, by the elected government of the anti-communist and USA-aligned military officer Eurico Dutra. Relations were restored in 1961. With the dissolution of the Soviet Union in 1991, the Brazilian government was among the first to recognize the Russian Federation as the successor state of the USSR. The Soviet ambassador, continued as representative of the Russian Federation until 1992.

List of representatives (1828 – present)

Representatives of the Russian Empire to the Empire of Brazil (1828 – 1889)

Representatives of the Russian Empire to the Republic of Brazil (1889 – 1917)

Representatives of the Soviet Union to the Republic of Brazil (1946 – 1991)

Representatives of the Russian Federation to the Republic of Brazil (1991 – present)

References

 
Brazil
Russia